Panat Kittipanuwong, simply known as Ter is a Thai futsal Winger. He plays for Chonburi Bluewave in Futsal Thailand League and is the part of Thailand national futsal team in 2016 AFF Futsal Championship.

References

Panat Kittipanuwong
1998 births
Living people
Panat Kittipanuwong
Panat Kittipanuwong
Southeast Asian Games medalists in futsal
Competitors at the 2021 Southeast Asian Games